Pambeh Juq (also Romanized as Pāmbeh Jūq; also known as Pābūqlujā, Pāmbeh Jūqeh, Pāmbū Qolūjā, Panbeh Jūqeh, Panbukilcha, and Panbuqulcha) is a village in Mojezat Rural District, in the Central District of Zanjan County, Zanjan Province, Iran. At the 2006 census, its population was 242, in 58 families.

References 

Populated places in Zanjan County